Tsvetan Ilchev (6 September 1936 – 25 November 2015) was a Bulgarian football manager.

References

1938 births
2015 deaths
Bulgarian football managers
Bulgaria national football team managers
Doxa Drama F.C. managers
Anorthosis Famagusta F.C. managers
Bulgarian expatriate football managers
Expatriate football managers in Greece
Bulgarian expatriate sportspeople in Greece
Expatriate football managers in Cyprus
Bulgarian expatriate sportspeople in Cyprus